= Sa-koi =

Higher education institute in Kachin State, Myanmar

Coordinates: 19°54′17.9″N 97°01′59.6″E

Sa-koi (also known as Sagwe) was a small Shan state in what is today Burma. It belonged to the Central Division of the Southern Shan States.
